Philotes may refer to:
 Philotes (mythology), a minor Greek Goddess, the personification of affection; she belongs in a group of several deities of love: Agape (altruistic love of mankind), Philia (friendly love), Eros (sensual love) and Storge (the love for children and animals)
 Philotes, the plural form of a fictional particle in Orson Scott Card's Ender's Game series
 Philotes (butterfly) a genus of "Blue" butterflies

See also
-phil-